The musical term alto, meaning "high" in Italian (Latin: altus), historically refers to the contrapuntal part higher than the tenor and its associated vocal range. In 4-part voice leading alto is the second-highest part, sung in choruses by either low women's or high men's voices. In vocal classification these are usually called contralto and male alto or countertenor.

Such confusion of "high" and "low" persists in instrumental terminology. Alto flute and alto trombone are respectively lower and higher than the standard instruments of the family (the standard instrument of the trombone family being the tenor trombone), though both play in ranges within the alto clef. Alto recorder, however, is an octave higher, and is defined by its relationship to tenor and soprano recorders; alto clarinet is a fifth lower than B-flat clarinet, already an 'alto' instrument. There is even a contra-alto clarinet, (an octave lower than the alto clarinet), with a range B♭0 – D4.

Etymology
In choral music for mixed voices, "alto" describes the lowest part commonly sung by women. The explanation for the anomaly of this name is to be found not in the use of adult falsettists in choirs of men and boys but further back in innovations in composition during the mid-15th century. Before this time it was usual to write a melodic cantus or superius against a tenor (from Latin tenere, to hold) or 'held' part, to which might be added a contratenor, which was in counterpoint with (in other words, against = contra) the tenor. The composers of Ockeghem's generation wrote two contratenor parts and designated them as contratenor altus and contratenor bassus; they were respectively higher and lower than the tenor part. From these derive both the modern terms "alto" (and contralto) and "bass".

Solo voices

The contralto voice is a matter of vocal timbre and tessitura as well as range, and a classically trained solo contralto would usually have a range greater than that of a normal choral alto part in both the upper and lower ranges. However, the vocal tessitura of a classically trained contralto would still make these singers more comfortable singing in the lower part of the voice. A choral non-solo contralto may also have a low range down to D3 (thus perhaps finding it easier to sing the choral tenor part), but some would have difficulty singing above E5. In a choral context mezzo-sopranos and contraltos might sing the alto part, together with countertenors, thus having three vocal timbres (and two means of vocal production) singing the same notes.

The use of the term "alto" to describe solo voices is mostly seen in contemporary (e.g. pop) music, and is rarely seen in classical music outside of soloists in choral works, though there are many terms in common usage in various languages and in different cultures for solo singers in this range. Examples include contralto, countertenor, haute-contre, and tenor altino, among others.

In choral music 

In SATB four-part mixed chorus, the alto is the second-highest vocal range, above the tenor and bass and below the soprano. The alto range in choral music is approximately from F3 (the F below middle C) to F5 (the second F above middle C). In common usage, alto is used to describe the voice type that typically sings this part, though this is not strictly correct. Alto, like the other three standard modern choral voice classifications (soprano, tenor and bass) was originally intended to describe a part within a homophonic or polyphonic texture, rather than an individual voice type; neither are the terms alto and contralto interchangeable or synonymous, though they are often treated as such.

Although some women who sing alto in a choir are contraltos, many would be more accurately called mezzo-sopranos (a voice of somewhat higher range and different timbre). Men singing in this range are countertenors, although this term is a source of considerable controversy, some authorities preferring the usage of the term "male alto" for those countertenors who use a predominantly falsetto voice production (boys singing in their natural range may be termed "boy altos").

See also
 Voice classification in non-classical music

References

Citations

General and cited sources

Further reading

External links
 

Choral music
Musical terminology
Pitch (music)
Voice types

de:Alt (Stimmlage)